Dondaicha railway station is located in Dondaicha town of Dhule district, Maharashtra. Its code is DDE. It has two platforms. Passenger, MEMU, Express and Superfast trains halt here.

Trains

The following trains halt at Dondaicha railway station in both directions:

 12834/33 Howrah–Ahmedabad Superfast Express
 12655/56 Navjivan Express
 19045/46 Tapti Ganga Express
 22947/48 Surat–Bhagalpur Express
 19025/26 Surat–Amravati Express
 17037/38 Secunderabad–Hisar Express
 19003/04 Khandesh Express
 18405/06 Puri–Ahmedabad Weekly Express
 18401/02 Puri–Okha Dwarka Express
 18421/22 Puri–Ajmer Express
 22138/37 Prerana Express
 69170/80 Udhna–Paldhi MEMU
 59013/14 Surat–Bhusawal Passenger
 59077/78 Surat–Bhusawal Passenger
 59075/76 Surat–Bhusawal Passenger

References 

Railway stations in Dhule district
Mumbai WR railway division